The Victoria Cross (VC) is a military decoration that may be bestowed upon members of the British or Commonwealth armed forces for acts of valour or gallantry performed in the face of the enemy. Within the British honours system and those of many Commonwealth nations it is the highest award a soldier can receive for actions in combat. It was established in 1856 and since then has been awarded 1,356 times; three service personnel have received the award twice.

The VC was introduced on 29 January 1856 by Queen Victoria to reward acts of valour during the Crimean War. The traditional explanation of the source of the gunmetal from which the medals are struck is that it derives from Russian cannon captured at the siege of Sevastopol. Recent research has thrown doubt on this story, suggesting a variety of origins. The original Royal Warrant did not contain a specific clause regarding posthumous awards, although official policy was to not award the VC posthumously. Between 1897 and 1901, several notices were issued in the London Gazette regarding soldiers who would have been awarded the VC had they survived. In a partial reversal of policy in 1902, six of the soldiers mentioned were granted the VC, but not "officially" awarded the medal. In 1907, the posthumous policy was completely reversed and medals were sent to the next of kin of the six officers and men. The Victoria Cross warrant was not officially amended to explicitly allow posthumous awards until 1920 but one quarter of all awards for the First World War were posthumous.

Due to its rarity, the VC is highly prized and the medal has fetched over £400,000 at auction. A number of public and private collections are devoted to the Victoria Cross. The private collection of Lord Ashcroft, amassed since 1986, contains over one-tenth of all VCs awarded. Following a 2008 donation to the Imperial War Museum, the Ashcroft collection went on public display alongside the museum's Victoria and George Cross collection in November 2010. Since 1990, three Commonwealth countries that retain the Queen as head of state have instituted their own versions of the VC. As a result, the original Victoria Cross is sometimes referred to as the "Commonwealth Victoria Cross" or the "Imperial Victoria Cross", to distinguish it from the newer awards.

The British Royal Regiment of Artillery was formed at Woolwich in 1716. Being present at almost every battle the British Army has been involved in, several of its batteries are now named after Victoria Cross actions. J (Sidi Rezegh) Battery Royal Horse Artillery is one of these units, and is named after the Battle of Sidi Rezegh during which Second Lieutenant George Gunn performed the deeds for which he was later awarded a posthumous Victoria Cross.

Since its introduction there have been sixty-five awards of the Victoria Cross to artillerymen, awarded for bravery in eight different wars. The first award was during the Crimean War and the last for the Second World War. The recipients include an Indian serving in the Indian Artillery, a member of the Royal Australian Artillery, and sixteen members of the then Bengal or Bombay Armies. The remainder have been from the three branches of the British Royal Artillery: the Royal Horse Artillery, the Royal Field Artillery, and the Royal Garrison Artillery. Two artillerymen received the award for actions performed while they were serving with other formations, one in the First World War with the Royal Flying Corps, and one in the Second World War with the British Commandos.

Artillery recipients

References
Footnotes

Citations

 

Artillery
 
Royal Artillery